The 1956–57 Boston Celtics season was the 11th season for the franchise in the National Basketball Association (NBA). This was the first time in franchise history, where the Celtics advanced to the NBA Finals, which they would later go onto win over the St. Louis Hawks in 7 games. The Celtics would make the Finals a record 10 consecutive seasons, spanning from this season to the 1965–66 season. They were led by 1957's MVP Bob Cousy, as well as Bill Russell, Bill Sharman, and 1957's Rookie of the Year Tom Heinsohn.

With Russell's death in 2022, Bob Cousy is the only remaining player from the 1957 championship team still alive.

Offseason

NBA Draft

Roster
{| class="toccolours" style="font-size: 85%; width: 100%;"
|-
! colspan="2" style="background-color: #008040;  color: #FFFFFF; text-align: center;" | Boston Celtics roster
|- style="background-color: #EFE196; color: #008040;   text-align: center;"
! Players !! Coaches
|-
| valign="top" |
{| class="sortable" style="background:transparent; margin:0px; width:100%;"
! Pos. !! # !! Nat. !! Name !! Height !! Weight !! DOB (Y-M-D) !! From
|-

Regular season

Season standings

Record vs. opponents

Game log

Player statistics

Season

* – Stats with the Celtics.

Playoffs

Playoffs

|- align="center" bgcolor="#ccffcc"
| 1
| March 21
| Syracuse
| W 108–90
| Frank Ramsey (20)
| Bill Russell (31)
| Boston Garden
| 1–0
|- align="center" bgcolor="#ccffcc"
| 2
| March 23
| @ Syracuse
| W 120–105
| Tom Heinsohn (30)
| Bill Russell (30)
| Onondaga War Memorial
| 2–0
|- align="center" bgcolor="#ccffcc"
| 3
| March 24
| Syracuse
| W 83–80
| Bill Sharman (23)
| Bill Russell (23)
| Boston Garden
| 3–0
|-

|- align="center" bgcolor="#ffcccc"
| 1
| March 30
| St. Louis
| L 123–125 (2OT)
| Bill Sharman (36)
| Bill Russell (18)
| —
| Boston Garden5,976
| 0–1
|- align="center" bgcolor="#ccffcc"
| 2
| March 31
| St. Louis
| W 119–99
| Cousy, Ramsey (22)
| Bill Russell (25)
| Bob Cousy (7)
| Boston Garden13,909
| 1–1
|- align="center" bgcolor="#ffcccc"
| 3
| April 6
| @ St. Louis
| L 98–100
| Bill Sharman (28)
| Bill Russell (19)
| Bob Cousy (8)
| Kiel Auditorium10,048
| 1–2
|- align="center" bgcolor="#ccffcc"
| 4
| April 7
| @ St. Louis
| W 123–118
| Bob Cousy (31)
| Bill Russell (20)
| Arnie Risen (9)
| Kiel Auditorium10,035
| 2–2
|- align="center" bgcolor="#ccffcc"
| 5
| April 9
| St. Louis
| W 124–109
| Bill Sharman (32)
| Bill Russell (23)
| Bob Cousy (19)
| Boston Garden13,909
| 3–2
|- align="center" bgcolor="#ffcccc"
| 6
| April 11
| @ St. Louis
| L 94–96
| Tom Heinsohn (28)
| Bill Russell (23)
| —
| Kiel Auditorium10,053
| 3–3
|- align="center" bgcolor="#ccffcc"
| 7
| April 13
| St. Louis
| W 125–123 (2OT)
| Tom Heinsohn (37)
| Bill Russell (32)
| Bob Cousy (11)
| Boston Garden13,909
| 4–3
|-

Awards and honors
 Bob Cousy, NBA MVP of the Year
 Bob Cousy, All-NBA First Team
 Tom Heinsohn, NBA Rookie of the Year
 Bill Sharman, All-NBA First Team

References

 Celtics on Database Basketball
 Celtics on Basketball Reference

Boston Celtics seasons
NBA championship seasons
Boston Celtics
Boston Celtics
Boston Celtics
1950s in Boston